Cloflubicyne is a chemical compound which is a chlorinated derivative of BIDN. It's an irreversible GABA receptor antagonist with powerful convulsant effects.

See also
BIDN
EBOB

References

Convulsants
GABAA receptor negative allosteric modulators
Irreversible antagonists
Norbornanes
Nitriles
Trifluoromethyl compounds
Organochlorides